During World War II, the United States forcibly relocated and incarcerated at least 125,284 people of Japanese descent in 75 identified incarceration sites. Most lived on the Pacific Coast, in concentration camps in the western interior of the country. Approximately two-thirds of the inmates were United States citizens. These actions were initiated by president Franklin D. Roosevelt via an executive order shortly after Imperial Japan's attack on Pearl Harbor.

Of the 127,000 Japanese Americans who were living in the continental United States at the time of the Pearl Harbor attack, 112,000 resided on the West Coast. About 80,000 were Nisei (literal translation: 'second generation'; American-born Japanese with U.S. citizenship) and Sansei ('third generation', the children of Nisei). The rest were Issei ('first generation') immigrants born in Japan who were ineligible for U.S. citizenship under U.S. law.

Japanese Americans were placed in concentration camps based on local population concentrations and regional politics. More than 112,000 Japanese Americans who were living on the West Coast were incarcerated in camps which were located in its interior. In Hawaii (which was under martial law), where more than 150,000 Japanese Americans comprised over one-third of the territory's population, only 1,200 to 1,800 were incarcerated. Colonel Karl Bendetsen, the architect of the program, went so far as to say that anyone with "one drop of Japanese blood" qualified for incarceration.

Roosevelt authorized Executive Order 9066, issued two months after Pearl Harbor, which allowed regional military commanders to designate "military areas" from which "any or all persons may be excluded." Although the executive order did not mention Japanese Americans, this authority was used to declare that all people of Japanese ancestry were required to leave Alaska and the military exclusion zones from all of California and parts of Oregon, Washington, and Arizona, with the exception of those inmates who were being held in government camps. The detainees were not only people of Japanese ancestry, they also included a relatively small number—though still totaling well over ten thousand—of people of German and Italian ancestry as well as Germans who were expelled from Latin America and deported to the U.S. Approximately 5,000 Japanese Americans relocated outside the exclusion zone before March 1942, while some 5,500 community leaders had been arrested immediately after the Pearl Harbor attack and thus were already in custody.

The United States Census Bureau assisted the incarceration efforts by providing specific individual census data on Japanese Americans. The Bureau denied its role for decades despite scholarly evidence to the contrary, and its role became more widely acknowledged by 2007. In its 1944 decision Korematsu v. United States, the U.S. Supreme Court upheld the constitutionality of the removals under the Due Process Clause of the Fifth Amendment to the United States Constitution. The Court limited its decision to the validity of the exclusion orders, avoiding the issue of the incarceration of U.S. citizens without due process, but ruled on the same day in Ex parte Endo that a loyal citizen could not be detained, which began their release. The day before the Korematsu and Endo rulings were made public, the exclusion orders were rescinded. Japanese Americans were initially barred from military service, but by 1943, they were allowed to join, with 20,000 serving during the war. Over 4,000 students were allowed to leave the camps to attend college.

At the time, Japanese incarceration was intended to mitigate a security risk which Japanese Americans were believed to pose, the scale of the incarceration in proportion to the size of the Japanese American population far surpassed similar measures which were undertaken against German and Italian Americans, who were interned due to being mostly non-citizens. Relocation was popularly supported at the time. According to a March 1942 poll conducted by the American Institute of Public Opinion, 93% of Americans supported the relocation of Japanese non-citizens from the Pacific Coast whereas only 1% opposed it. According to the same poll, 59% supported the relocation of Japanese people who were born in the country and were United States citizens, whereas 25% opposed it.

In the 1970s, under mounting pressure from the Japanese American Citizens League (JACL) and redress organizations, President Jimmy Carter opened an investigation to determine whether the decision to put Japanese Americans into concentration camps had been justified by the government. He appointed the Commission on Wartime Relocation and Internment of Civilians (CWRIC) to investigate the camps. In 1983, the Commission's report, Personal Justice Denied, found little evidence of Japanese disloyalty at the time and concluded that the incarceration had been the product of racism. It recommended that the government pay reparations to the detainees. In 1988, President Ronald Reagan signed into law the Civil Liberties Act of 1988 which officially apologized for the incarceration on behalf of the U.S. government and authorized a payment of $20,000 to each former detainee who was still alive when the act was passed. The legislation admitted that government actions were based on "race prejudice, war hysteria, and a failure of political leadership." By 1992, the U.S. government eventually disbursed more than $1.6 billion (equivalent to $ billion in ) in reparations to 82,219 Japanese Americans who had been incarcerated.

Background

Japanese Americans before World War II

Due in large part to socio-political changes which stemmed from the Meiji Restoration—and a recession which was caused by the abrupt opening of Japan's economy to the world economy—people started to emigrate from the Empire of Japan in 1868 because they needed to get jobs which would enable them to survive. From 1869 to 1924 approximately 200,000 immigrated to the islands of Hawaii, mostly laborers expecting to work on the islands' sugar plantations. Some 180,000 went to the U.S. mainland, with the majority of them settling on the West Coast and establishing farms or small businesses. Most arrived before 1908, when the Gentlemen's Agreement between Japan and the United States banned the immigration of unskilled laborers. A loophole allowed the wives of men who were already living in the US to join their husbands. The practice of women marrying by proxy and immigrating to the U.S. resulted in a large increase in the number of "picture brides."

As the Japanese-American population continued to grow, European Americans who lived on the West Coast resisted the arrival of this ethnic group, fearing competition from it and making the exaggerated claim that hordes of Asians were keen to take over white-owned farmland and businesses. Groups such as the Asiatic Exclusion League, the California Joint Immigration Committee, and the Native Sons of the Golden West organized in response to the rise of this "Yellow Peril." They successfully lobbied to restrict the property and citizenship rights of Japanese immigrants, just as similar groups had previously organized against Chinese immigrants. Beginning in the late 19th century, several laws and treaties which attempted to slow immigration from Japan were introduced. The Immigration Act of 1924, which followed the example of the 1882 Chinese Exclusion Act, effectively banned all immigration from Japan and other "undesirable" Asian countries.

The 1924 ban on immigration produced unusually well-defined generational groups within the Japanese-American community. The Issei were exclusively those Japanese who had immigrated before 1924; some of them desired to return to their homeland. Because no more immigrants were permitted, all Japanese Americans who were born after 1924 were, by definition, born in the U.S. and by law, they were automatically considered U.S. citizens. The members of this Nisei generation constituted a cohort which was distinct from the cohort which their parents belonged to. In addition to the usual generational differences, Issei men were typically ten to fifteen years older than their wives, making them significantly older than the younger children in their often large families. U.S. law prohibited Japanese immigrants from becoming naturalized citizens, making them dependent on their children whenever they rented or purchased property. Communication between English-speaking children and parents who mostly or completely spoke in Japanese was often difficult. A significant number of older Nisei, many of whom were born prior to the immigration ban, had married and already started families of their own by the time the US entered World War II.

Despite racist legislation which prevented Issei from becoming naturalized citizens (or owning property, voting, or running for political office), these Japanese immigrants established communities in their new hometowns. Japanese Americans contributed to the agriculture of California and other Western states, by introducing irrigation methods which enabled them to cultivate fruits, vegetables, and flowers on previously inhospitable land.

In both rural and urban areas, kenjinkai, community groups for immigrants from the same Japanese prefecture, and fujinkai, Buddhist women's associations, organized community events and did charitable work, provided loans and financial assistance and built Japanese language schools for their children. Excluded from setting up shop in white neighborhoods, nikkei-owned small businesses thrived in the Nihonmachi, or Japantowns of urban centers, such as Los Angeles, San Francisco, and Seattle.

In the 1930s, the Office of Naval Intelligence (ONI), concerned as a result of Imperial Japan's rising military power in Asia, began to conduct surveillance in Japanese-American communities in Hawaii. Starting in 1936, at the behest of President Roosevelt, the ONI began to compile a "special list of those Japanese Americans who would be the first to be placed in a concentration camp in the event of trouble" between Japan and the United States. In 1939, again by order of the President, the ONI, Military Intelligence Division, and FBI began working together to compile a larger Custodial Detention Index. Early in 1941, Roosevelt commissioned Curtis Munson to conduct an investigation on Japanese Americans living on the West Coast and in Hawaii. After working with FBI and ONI officials and interviewing Japanese Americans and those familiar with them, Munson determined that the "Japanese problem" was nonexistent. His final report to the President, submitted November 7, 1941, "certified a remarkable, even extraordinary degree of loyalty among this generally suspect ethnic group." A subsequent report by Kenneth Ringle (ONI), delivered to the President in January 1942, also found little evidence to support claims of Japanese-American disloyalty and argued against mass incarceration.

After Pearl Harbor

The surprise attack on Pearl Harbor on December 7, 1941, led military and political leaders to suspect that Imperial Japan was preparing a full-scale invasion of the United States West Coast. Due to Japan's rapid military conquest of a large portion of Asia and the Pacific including a small portion of the U.S. West Coast (i.e., Aleutian Islands Campaign) between 1937 and 1942, some Americans feared that its military forces were unstoppable.

American public opinion initially stood by the large population of Japanese Americans living on the West Coast, with the Los Angeles Times characterizing them as "good Americans, born and educated as such." Many Americans believed that their loyalty to the United States was unquestionable. However, six weeks after the attack, public opinion along the Pacific began to turn against Japanese Americans living on the West Coast, as the press and other Americans became nervous about the potential for fifth column activity. Though the administration (including President Franklin D. Roosevelt and FBI Director J. Edgar Hoover) dismissed all rumors of Japanese-American espionage on behalf of the Japanese war effort, pressure mounted upon the administration as the tide of public opinion turned against Japanese Americans. Although the impact on US authorities is controversial, the Niihau incident immediately followed the attack on Pearl Harbor, when Ishimatsu Shintani, an Issei, and Yoshio Harada, a Nisei, and his Issei wife Irene Harada on the island of Ni'ihau violently freed a downed and captured Japanese naval airman, attacking their fellow Ni'ihau islanders in the process.

Several concerns over the loyalty of ethnic Japanese seemed to stem from racial prejudice rather than any evidence of malfeasance. The Roberts Commission report, which investigated the Pearl Harbor attack, was released on January 25 and accused persons of Japanese ancestry of espionage leading up to the attack. Although the report's key finding was that General Walter Short and Admiral Husband E. Kimmel had been derelict in their duties during the attack on Pearl Harbor, one passage made vague reference to "Japanese consular agents and other... persons having no open relations with the Japanese foreign service" transmitting information to Japan. It was unlikely that these "spies" were Japanese American, as Japanese intelligence agents were distrustful of their American counterparts and preferred to recruit "white persons and Negroes." However, despite the fact that the report made no mention of Americans of Japanese ancestry, national and West Coast media nevertheless used the report to vilify Japanese Americans and inflame public opinion against them.

Major Karl Bendetsen and Lieutenant General John L. DeWitt, head of the Western Defense Command, questioned Japanese-American loyalty. DeWitt said:

He further stated in a conversation with California's governor, Culbert L. Olson,

DeWitt, who administered the incarceration program, repeatedly told newspapers that "A Jap's a Jap" and testified to Congress,

DeWitt also sought approval to conduct search and seizure operations which were aimed at preventing alien Japanese from making radio transmissions to Japanese ships. The Justice Department declined, stating that there was no probable cause to support DeWitt's assertion, as the FBI concluded that there was no security threat. On January 2, the Joint Immigration Committee of the California Legislature sent a manifesto to California newspapers which attacked "the ethnic Japanese," who it alleged were "totally unassimilable." This manifesto further argued that all people of Japanese heritage were loyal subjects of the Emperor of Japan; the manifesto contended that Japanese language schools were bastions of racism which advanced doctrines of Japanese racial superiority.

The manifesto was backed by the Native Sons and Daughters of the Golden West and the California Department of the American Legion, which in January demanded that all Japanese with dual citizenship be placed in concentration camps. By February, Earl Warren, the Attorney General of California (and a future Chief Justice of the United States), had begun his efforts to persuade the federal government to remove all people of Japanese ethnicity from the West Coast.

Those who were as little as  Japanese were placed in incarceration camps. Bendetsen, promoted to colonel, said in 1942, "I am determined that if they have one drop of Japanese blood in them, they must go to camp."

Upon the bombing of Pearl Harbor and pursuant to the Alien Enemies Act, Presidential Proclamations 2525, 2526 and 2527 were issued designating Japanese, German and Italian nationals as enemy aliens. Information gathered by US officials over the previous decade was used to locate and incarcerate thousands of Japanese-American community leaders in the days immediately following Pearl Harbor (see section elsewhere in this article "Other concentration camps"). In Hawaii, under the auspices of martial law, both "enemy aliens" and citizens of Japanese and "German" descent were arrested and interned (incarcerated if they were a US citizen).

Presidential Proclamation 2537 (codified at 7 Fed. Reg. 329) was issued on January 14, 1942, requiring "alien enemies" to obtain a certificate of identification and carry it "at all times". Enemy aliens were not allowed to enter restricted areas. Violators of these regulations were subject to "arrest, detention and incarceration for the duration of the war."

On February 13, the Pacific Coast Congressional subcommittee on aliens and sabotage recommended to the President immediate evacuation of "all persons of Japanese lineage and all others, aliens and citizens alike" who were thought to be dangerous from "strategic areas," further specifying that these included the entire "strategic area" of California, Oregon, Washington, and Alaska. On February 16 the President tasked Secretary of War Henry L. Stimson with replying. A conference on February 17 of Secretary Stimson with assistant secretary John J. McCloy, Provost Marshal General Allen W. Gullion, Deputy chief of Army Ground Forces Mark W. Clark, and Colonel Bendetsen decided that General DeWitt should be directed to commence evacuations "to the extent he deemed necessary" to protect vital installations. Throughout the war, interned Japanese Americans protested against their treatment and insisted that they be recognized as loyal Americans. Many sought to demonstrate their patriotism by trying to enlist in the armed forces. Although early in the war Japanese Americans were barred from military service, by 1943 the army had begun actively recruiting Nisei to join new all-Japanese American units.

Development

Executive Order 9066 and related actions

Executive Order 9066, signed by Franklin D. Roosevelt on February 19, 1942, authorized military commanders to designate "military areas" at their discretion, "from which any or all persons may be excluded." These "exclusion zones," unlike the "alien enemy" roundups, were applicable to anyone that an authorized military commander might choose, whether citizen or non-citizen. Eventually such zones would include parts of both the East and West Coasts, totaling about 1/3 of the country by area. Unlike the subsequent deportation and incarceration programs that would come to be applied to large numbers of Japanese Americans, detentions and restrictions directly under this Individual Exclusion Program were placed primarily on individuals of German or Italian ancestry, including American citizens.

On March 2, 1942, General John DeWitt, commanding general of the Western Defense Command, publicly announced the creation of two military restricted zones. Military Area No. 1 consisted of the southern half of Arizona and the western half of California, Oregon, and Washington, as well as all of California south of Los Angeles. Military Area No. 2 covered the rest of those states. DeWitt's proclamation informed Japanese Americans they would be required to leave Military Area 1, but stated that they could remain in the second restricted zone. Removal from Military Area No. 1 initially occurred through "voluntary evacuation." Japanese Americans were free to go anywhere outside of the exclusion zone or inside Area 2, with arrangements and costs of relocation to be borne by the individuals. The policy was short-lived; DeWitt issued another proclamation on March 27 that prohibited Japanese Americans from leaving Area 1. A night-time curfew, also initiated on March 27, 1942, placed further restrictions on the movements and daily lives of Japanese Americans.

Included in the forced removal was Alaska, which, like Hawaii, was an incorporated U.S. territory located in the northwest extremity of the continental United States. Unlike the contiguous West Coast, Alaska was not subject to any exclusion zones due to its small Japanese population. Nevertheless, the Western Defense Command announced in April 1942 that all Japanese people and Americans of Japanese ancestry were to leave the territory for incarceration camps inland. By the end of the month, over 200 Japanese residents regardless of citizenship were exiled from Alaska, most of them ended up at the Minidoka War Relocation Center in Southern Idaho.

Eviction from the West Coast began on March 24, 1942, with Civilian Exclusion Order No. 1, which gave the 227 Japanese American residents of Bainbridge Island, Washington six days to prepare for their "evacuation" directly to Manzanar. Colorado governor Ralph Lawrence Carr was the only elected official to publicly denounce the incarceration of American citizens (an act that cost his reelection, but gained him the gratitude of the Japanese American community, such that a statue of him was erected in the Denver Japantown's Sakura Square). A total of 108 exclusion orders issued by the Western Defense Command over the next five months completed the removal of Japanese Americans from the West Coast in August 1942.

In addition to imprisoning those of Japanese descent in the US, the US also interned Japanese (and Germans and Italians) deported from Latin America. Thirteen Latin American countries—Bolivia, Colombia, Costa Rica, Dominican Republic, Ecuador, El Salvador, Guatemala, Haiti, Honduras, Mexico, Nicaragua, Panama, and Peru—cooperated with the US by apprehending, detaining and deporting to the US 2,264 Japanese Latin American citizens and permanent residents of Japanese ancestry.

Support and opposition

Non-military advocates of exclusion, removal, and detention

The deportation and incarceration of Japanese Americans was popular among many white farmers who resented the Japanese American farmers. "White American farmers admitted that their self-interest required the removal of the Japanese." These individuals saw incarceration as a convenient means of uprooting their Japanese-American competitors. Austin E. Anson, managing secretary of the Salinas Vegetable Grower-Shipper Association, told The Saturday Evening Post in 1942:

The Leadership of the Japanese American Citizens League did not question the constitutionality of the exclusion of Japanese Americans from the West Coast. Instead, arguing it would better serve the community to follow government orders without protest, the organization advised the approximately 120,000 affected to go peacefully.

The Roberts Commission Report, prepared at President Franklin D. Roosevelt's request, has been cited as an example of the fear and prejudice informing the thinking behind the incarceration program. The Report sought to link Japanese Americans with espionage activity, and to associate them with the bombing of Pearl Harbor. Columnist Henry McLemore, who wrote for the Hearst newspapers, reflected the growing public sentiment that was fueled by this report:

Other California newspapers also embraced this view. According to a Los Angeles Times editorial,

State politicians joined the bandwagon that was embraced by Leland Ford of Los Angeles, who demanded that "all Japanese, whether citizens or not, be placed in [inland] concentration camps."

Incarceration of Japanese Americans, who provided critical agricultural labor on the West Coast, created a labor shortage which was exacerbated by the induction of many white American laborers into the Armed Forces. This vacuum precipitated a mass immigration of Mexican workers into the United States to fill these jobs, under the banner of what became known as the Bracero Program. Many Japanese detainees were temporarily released from their camps – for instance, to harvest Western beet crops – to address this wartime labor shortage.

Non-military advocates who opposed exclusion, removal, and detention
Like many white American farmers, the white businessmen of Hawaii had their own motives for determining how to deal with the Japanese Americans, but they opposed their incarceration. Instead, these individuals gained the passage of legislation which enabled them to retain the freedom of the nearly 150,000 Japanese Americans who would have otherwise been sent to concentration camps which were located in Hawaii. As a result, only 1,200 to 1,800 Japanese Americans in Hawaii were incarcerated.

The powerful businessmen of Hawaii concluded that the imprisonment of such a large proportion of the islands' population would adversely affect the economic prosperity of the territory. The Japanese represented "over 90 percent of the carpenters, nearly all of the transportation workers, and a significant portion of the agricultural laborers" on the islands.
General Delos Carleton Emmons, the military governor of Hawaii, also argued that Japanese labor was "'absolutely essential' for rebuilding the defenses destroyed at Pearl Harbor." Recognizing the Japanese-American community's contribution to the affluence of the Hawaiian economy, General Emmons fought against the incarceration of the Japanese Americans and had the support of most of the businessmen of Hawaii. By comparison, Idaho governor Chase A. Clark, in a Lions Club speech on May 22, 1942, said "Japs live like rats, breed like rats and act like rats. We don't want them ... permanently located in our state."

Initially, Oregon's governor Charles A. Sprague opposed the incarceration, and as a result, he decided not to enforce it in the state and he also discouraged residents from harassing their fellow citizens, the Nisei. He turned against the Japanese by mid-February 1942, days before the executive order was issued, but he later regretted this decision and he attempted to atone for it for the rest of his life.

Reaching different conclusions about how the Japanese-American community should be dealt with, both the white farmers of the continental United States and the white businessmen of Hawaii made the protection of their own economic interests a high priority.

Even though the incarceration was a generally popular policy in California, it was not universally supported. R.C. Hoiles, publisher of the Orange County Register, argued during the war that the incarceration was unethical and unconstitutional:

It would seem that convicting people of disloyalty to our country without having specific evidence against them is too foreign to our way of life and too close akin to the kind of government we are fighting.... We must realize, as Henry Emerson Fosdick so wisely said, 'Liberty is always dangerous, but it is the safest thing we have.'

Members of some Christian religious groups, particularly those who had formerly sent missionaries to Japan, were among the most tireless opponents of the incarceration policy. Some Baptist and Methodist churches, among others, also organized relief efforts to the camps, supplying inmates with supplies and information.

Statement of military necessity as a justification of incarceration

Niihau Incident

The Niihau Incident occurred in December 1941, just after the Imperial Japanese Navy's attack on Pearl Harbor. The Imperial Japanese Navy had designated the Hawaiian island of Niihau as an uninhabited island for damaged aircraft to land and await rescue. Three Japanese Americans on Niihau assisted a Japanese pilot, Shigenori Nishikaichi, who crashed there. Despite the incident, the Territorial Governor of Hawaii Joseph Poindexter rejected calls for the mass incarceration of the Japanese Americans living there.

Cryptography

In Magic: The Untold Story of U.S. Intelligence and the Evacuation of Japanese Residents From the West Coast During World War II, David Lowman, a former National Security Agency (NSA) operative, argues that Magic ("Magic" was the code-name for American code-breaking efforts) intercepts posed "frightening specter of massive espionage nets", thus justifying incarceration. Lowman contended that incarceration served to ensure the secrecy of U.S. code-breaking efforts, because effective prosecution of Japanese Americans might necessitate disclosure of secret information. If U.S. code-breaking technology was revealed in the context of trials of individual spies, the Japanese Imperial Navy would change its codes, thus undermining U.S. strategic wartime advantage.

Some scholars have criticized or dismissed Lowman's reasoning that "disloyalty" among some individual Japanese Americans could legitimize "incarcerating 120,000 people, including infants, the elderly, and the mentally ill". Lowman's reading of the contents of the Magic cables has also been challenged, as some scholars contend that the cables demonstrate that Japanese Americans were not heeding the overtures of Imperial Japan to spy against the United States. According to one critic, Lowman's book has long since been "refuted and discredited".

The controversial conclusions drawn by Lowman were defended by conservative commentator Michelle Malkin in her book In Defense of Internment: The Case for 'Racial Profiling' in World War II and the War on Terror (2004). Malkin's defense of Japanese incarceration was due in part to reaction to what she describes as the "constant alarmism from Bush-bashers who argue that every counter-terror measure in America is tantamount to the internment". She criticized academia's treatment of the subject, and suggested that academics critical of Japanese incarceration had ulterior motives. Her book was widely criticized, particularly with regard to her reading of the "Magic" cables. Daniel Pipes, also drawing on Lowman, has defended Malkin, and said that Japanese American incarceration was "a good idea" which offers "lessons for today".

Black and Jewish reactions to the Japanese-American incarceration

The American public overwhelmingly approved of the Japanese-American incarceration measures and as a result, they were seldom opposed, particularly by members of minority groups who felt that they were also being chastised within America. Morton Grodzins writes that "The sentiment against the Japanese was not far removed from (and it was interchangeable with) sentiments against Negroes and Jews." Occasionally, the NAACP and the NCJW spoke out. This sort of shared experience has led some modern Japanese-American leaders to come out in vocal support of HR-40, a bill which calls for reparations to be paid to African-Americans because they are affected by slavery and subsequent discrimination. Cheryl Greenberg adds "Not all Americans endorsed such racism. Two similarly oppressed groups, African Americans and Jewish Americans, had already organized to fight discrimination and bigotry." However, due to the justification of concentration camps by the US government, "few seemed tactile to endorse the evacuation; most did not even discuss it." Greenberg argues that at the time, the incarceration was not discussed because the government's rhetoric hid the motivations for it behind a guise of military necessity, and a fear of seeming "un-American" led to the silencing of most civil rights groups until years into the policy.

United States District Court's opinions

A letter by General DeWitt and Colonel Bendetsen expressing racist bias against Japanese Americans was circulated and then hastily redacted in 1943–1944. DeWitt's final report stated that, because of their race, it was impossible to determine the loyalty of Japanese Americans, thus necessitating incarceration. The original version was so offensive – even in the atmosphere of the wartime 1940s – that Bendetsen ordered all copies to be destroyed.

In 1980, a copy of the original Final Report: Japanese Evacuation from the West Coast – 1942 was found in the National Archives, along with notes which show the numerous differences which exist between the original version and the redacted version. This earlier, racist and inflammatory version, as well as the FBI and Office of Naval Intelligence (ONI) reports, led to the coram nobis retrials which overturned the convictions of Fred Korematsu, Gordon Hirabayashi and Minoru Yasui on all charges related to their refusal to submit to exclusion and incarceration. The courts found that the government had intentionally withheld these reports and other critical evidence, at trials all the way up to the Supreme Court, which proved that there was no military necessity for the exclusion and incarceration of Japanese Americans. In the words of Department of Justice officials writing during the war, the justifications were based on "willful historical inaccuracies and intentional falsehoods".

The Ringle Report
In May 2011, U.S. Solicitor General Neal Katyal, after a year of investigation, found Charles Fahy had intentionally withheld The Ringle Report drafted by the Office of Naval Intelligence, in order to justify the Roosevelt administration's actions in the cases of Hirabayashi v. United States and Korematsu v. United States. The report would have undermined the administration's position of the military necessity for such action, as it concluded that most Japanese Americans were not a national security threat, and that allegations of communication espionage had been found to be without basis by the FBI and Federal Communications Commission.

Newspaper editorials
Editorials from major newspapers at the time were generally supportive of the incarceration of the Japanese by the United States.

A Los Angeles Times editorial dated February 19, 1942, stated that:

Since Dec. 7 there has existed an obvious menace to the safety of this region in the presence of potential saboteurs and fifth columnists close to oil refineries and storage tanks, airplane factories, Army posts, Navy facilities, ports and communications systems. Under normal sensible procedure not one day would have elapsed after Pearl Harbor before the government had proceeded to round up and send to interior points all Japanese aliens and their immediate descendants for classification and possible internment.

This dealt with aliens, and the unassimilated. Going even farther, an Atlanta Constitution editorial dated February 20, 1942, stated that:

The time to stop taking chances with Japanese aliens and Japanese-Americans has come. . . . While Americans have an inate [sic] distaste for stringent measures, every one must realize this is a total war, that there are no Americans running loose in Japan or Germany or Italy and there is absolutely no sense in this country running even the slightest risk of a major disaster from enemy groups within the nation.

A Washington Post editorial dated February 22, 1942, stated that:

There is but one way in which to regard the Presidential order empowering the Army to establish "military areas" from which citizens or aliens may be excluded. That is to accept the order as a necessary accompaniment of total defense.

A Los Angeles Times editorial dated February 28, 1942, stated that:

As to a considerable number of Japanese, no matter where born, there is unfortunately no doubt whatever. They are for Japan; they will aid Japan in every way possible by espionage, sabotage and other activity; and they need to be restrained for the safety of California and the United States. And since there is no sure test for loyalty to the United States, all must be restrained. Those truly loyal will understand and make no objection.

A Los Angeles Times editorial dated December 8, 1942, stated that:

The Japs in these centers in the United States have been afforded the very best of treatment, together with food and living quarters far better than many of them ever knew before, and a minimum amount of restraint. They have been as well fed as the Army and as well as or better housed. . . . The American people can go without milk and butter, but the Japs will be supplied.

A Los Angeles Times editorial dated April 22, 1943, stated that:

As a race, the Japanese have made for themselves a record for conscienceless treachery unsurpassed in history. Whatever small theoretical advantages there might be in releasing those under restraint in this country would be enormously outweighed by the risks involved.

Facilities

While this event is most commonly called the internment of Japanese Americans, the government operated several different types of camps holding Japanese Americans. The best known facilities were the military-run Wartime Civil Control Administration (WCCA) Assembly Centers and the civilian-run War Relocation Authority (WRA) Relocation Centers, which are generally (but unofficially) referred to as "internment camps". Scholars have urged dropping such euphemisms and refer to them as concentration camps and the people as incarcerated. The Department of Justice (DOJ) operated camps officially called Internment Camps, which were used to detain those suspected of crimes or of "enemy sympathies". The government also operated camps for a number of German Americans and Italian Americans, who sometimes were assigned to share facilities with the Japanese Americans. The WCCA and WRA facilities were the largest and the most public. The WCCA Assembly Centers were temporary facilities that were first set up in horse racing tracks, fairgrounds, and other large public meeting places to assemble and organize inmates before they were transported to WRA Relocation Centers by truck, bus, or train. The WRA Relocation Centers were semi-permanent camps that housed persons removed from the exclusion zone after March 1942, or until they were able to relocate elsewhere in the United States outside the exclusion zone.

DOJ and Army incarceration camps
Eight U.S. Department of Justice Camps (in Texas, Idaho, North Dakota, New Mexico, and Montana) held Japanese Americans, primarily non-citizens and their families. The camps were run by the Immigration and Naturalization Service, under the umbrella of the DOJ, and guarded by Border Patrol agents rather than military police. The population of these camps included approximately 3,800 of the 5,500 Buddhist and Christian ministers, school instructors, newspaper workers, fishermen, and community leaders who had been accused of fifth column activity and arrested by the FBI after Pearl Harbor. (The remaining 1,700 were released to WRA relocation centers.) Immigrants and nationals of German and Italian ancestry were also held in these facilities, often in the same camps as Japanese Americans. Approximately 7,000 German Americans and 3,000 Italian Americans from Hawai'i and the U.S. mainland were interned in DOJ camps, along with 500 German seamen already in custody after being rescued from the SS Columbus in 1939. In addition 2,264 ethnic Japanese, 4,058 ethnic Germans, and 288 ethnic Italians were deported from 19 Latin American countries for a later-abandoned hostage exchange program with Axis countries or confinement in DOJ camps.

Several U.S. Army incarceration camps held Japanese, Italian, and German American men considered "potentially dangerous". Camp Lordsburg, in New Mexico, was the only site built specifically to confine Japanese Americans. In May 1943, the Army was given responsibility for the detention of prisoners of war and all civilian internees were transferred to DOJ camps.

WCCA Civilian Assembly Centers

Executive Order 9066 authorized the removal of all persons of Japanese ancestry from the West Coast; however, it was signed before there were any facilities completed to house the displaced Japanese Americans. After the voluntary evacuation program failed to result in many families leaving the exclusion zone, the military took charge of the now-mandatory evacuation. On April 9, 1942, the Wartime Civil Control Administration (WCCA) was established by the Western Defense Command to coordinate the forced removal of Japanese Americans to inland concentration camps.

The relocation centers faced opposition from inland communities near the proposed sites who disliked the idea of their new "Jap" neighbors. In addition, government forces were struggling to build what would essentially be self-sufficient towns in very isolated, undeveloped, and harsh regions of the country; they were not prepared to house the influx of over 110,000 inmates. Since Japanese Americans living in the restricted zone were considered too dangerous to conduct their daily business, the military decided it had to house them in temporary centers until the relocation centers were completed.

Under the direction of Colonel Karl Bendetsen, existing facilities had been designated for conversion to WCCA use in March 1942, and the Army Corps of Engineers finished construction on these sites on April 21, 1942. All but four of the 15 confinement sites (12 in California, and one each in Washington, Oregon, and Arizona) had previously been racetracks or fairgrounds. The stables and livestock areas were cleaned out and hastily converted to living quarters for families of up to six, while wood and tarpaper barracks were constructed for additional housing, as well as communal latrines, laundry facilities, and mess halls. A total of 92,193 Japanese Americans were transferred to these temporary detention centers from March to August 1942. (18,026 more had been taken directly to two "reception centers" that were developed as the Manzanar and Poston WRA camps.) The WCCA was dissolved on March 15, 1943, when it became the War Relocation Authority and turned its attentions to the more permanent relocation centers.

WRA Relocation Centers

The War Relocation Authority (WRA) was the U.S. civilian agency responsible for the relocation and detention. The WRA was created by President Roosevelt on March 18, 1942, with Executive Order 9102 and it officially ceased to exist on June 30, 1946. Milton S. Eisenhower, then an official of the Department of Agriculture, was chosen to head the WRA. In the 1943 US Government film Japanese Relocation he said, "This picture tells how the mass migration was accomplished. Neither the Army, not the War Relocation Authority relish the idea of taking men, women and children from their homes, their shops and their farms. So, the military and civilian agencies alike, determined to do the job as a democracy should—with real consideration for the people involved." Dillon S. Myer replaced Eisenhower three months later on June 17, 1942. Myer served as Director of the WRA until the centers were closed. Within nine months, the WRA had opened ten facilities in seven states, and transferred over 100,000 people from the WCCA facilities.

The WRA camp at Tule Lake was integral to food production in its own camp, as well as other camps. Almost 30 crops were harvested at this site by farmworkers. Despite this, Tule Lake's camp was eventually used as a detention center for people believed to pose a security risk. Tule Lake also served as a "segregation center" for individuals and families who were deemed "disloyal", and for those who were to be deported to Japan.

List of camps

There were three types of camps. Civilian Assembly Centers were temporary camps, frequently located at horse tracks, where Japanese Americans were sent after they were removed from their communities. Eventually, most of the Japanese Americans were sent to Relocation Centers, also known as internment camps. Detention camps housed Nikkei who the government considered disruptive as well as Nikkei who the government believed were of special interest. When most of the Assembly Centers closed, they became training camps for US troops.

Civilian Assembly Centers
 Arcadia, California (Santa Anita Racetrack, stables) (Santa Anita assembly center)
 Fresno, California (Fresno Fairgrounds, racetrack, stables) Fresno Assembly Center
 Marysville / Arboga, California (migrant workers' camp) Arboga Assembly Center
 Mayer, Arizona (Civilian Conservation Corps camp)
 Merced, California (Merced County Fairgrounds-Merced Assembly Center)
 Owens Valley, California (Manzanar – Owens Valley Reception Center)
 Parker Dam, Arizona – (Poston War Relocation Center-Poston assembly center) 
 Pinedale, California (Pinedale Assembly Center, warehouses)
 Pomona, California (Los Angeles County Fairgrounds, racetrack, stables) (Pomona assembly center)
 Portland, Oregon (Pacific International Livestock Exposition, including 3,800 housed in the main pavilion building) (Portland Assembly Center)
 Puyallup, Washington (fairgrounds racetrack stables, Informally known as "Camp Harmony")
 Sacramento, California Camp Kohler (Site of Present-Day Walerga Park) (migrant workers' camp)
 Salinas, California (fairgrounds, racetrack, stables) Salinas Assembly Center
 San Bruno, California (Tanforan racetrack, stables)(Tanforan Assembly Center)
 Stockton, California (San Joaquin County Fairgrounds, racetrack, stables)
 Tulare, California (fairgrounds, racetrack, stables) Tulare Assembly Center
 Turlock, California (Stanislaus County Fairgrounds-Turlock Assembly Center)

Relocation Centers

 Gila River War Relocation Center, Arizona
 Granada War Relocation Center, Colorado (AKA "Amache")
 Heart Mountain War Relocation Center, Wyoming
 Jerome War Relocation Center, Arkansas
 Manzanar War Relocation Center, California
 Minidoka War Relocation Center, Idaho
 Poston War Relocation Center, Arizona
 Rohwer War Relocation Center, Arkansas
 Topaz War Relocation Center, Utah
 Tule Lake War Relocation Center, California

Justice Department detention camps
These camps often held German-American and Italian-American detainees in addition to Japanese Americans:
 Crystal City, Texas
 Fort Lincoln Internment Camp
 Fort Missoula, Montana
 Fort Stanton, New Mexico
 Kenedy, Texas
 Kooskia, Idaho
 Santa Fe, New Mexico
 Seagoville, Texas
 Forest Park, Georgia

Citizen Isolation Centers
The Citizen Isolation Centers were for those considered to be problem inmates.
 Leupp, Arizona
 Moab, Utah (AKA Dalton Wells)
 Fort Stanton, New Mexico (AKA Old Raton Ranch)

Federal Bureau of Prisons
Detainees convicted of crimes, usually draft resistance, were sent to these sites, mostly federal prisons:
 Catalina, Arizona
 Fort Leavenworth, Kansas
 McNeil Island, Washington

U.S. Army facilities
These camps often held German and Italian detainees in addition to Japanese Americans:
 Fort McDowell/Angel Island, California
 Camp Blanding, Florida
 Camp Forrest, Tennessee
 Camp Livingston, Louisiana
 Camp Lordsburg, New Mexico
 Camp McCoy, Wisconsin
 Florence, Arizona
 Fort Bliss, New Mexico and Texas
 Fort Howard, Maryland
 Fort Lewis, Washington
 Fort Meade, Maryland
 Fort Richardson, Alaska
 Fort Sam Houston, Texas
 Fort Sill, Oklahoma
 Griffith Park, California
 Honouliuli Internment Camp, Hawaiʻi
 Sand Island, Hawaiʻi
 Stringtown, Oklahoma

Immigration and Naturalization Service facilities
These immigration detention stations held the roughly 5,500 men arrested immediately after Pearl Harbor, in addition to several thousand German and Italian detainees, and served as processing centers from which the men were transferred to DOJ or Army camps:
 East Boston Immigration Station
 Ellis Island
 Cincinnati, Ohio
 San Pedro, Los Angeles
 Seattle, Washington
 Sharp Park, California
 Tuna Canyon, Los Angeles

Exclusion, removal, and detention

Somewhere between 110,000 and 120,000 people of Japanese ancestry were subject to this mass exclusion program, of whom about 80,000 Nisei (second generation) and Sansei (third generation) were U.S. citizens. The rest were Issei (first generation) who were subject to internment under the Alien Enemies Act; many of these "resident aliens" had been inhabitants of the United States for decades, but had been deprived by law of being able to become naturalized citizens. Also part of the West Coast removal were 101 orphaned children of Japanese descent taken from orphanages and foster homes within the exclusion zone.

Detainees of Japanese descent were first sent to one of 17 temporary "Civilian Assembly Centers", where most awaited transfer to more permanent relocation centers being constructed by the newly formed War Relocation Authority (WRA). Some of those who reported to the civilian assembly centers were not sent to relocation centers, but were released under the condition that they remain outside the prohibited zone until the military orders were modified or lifted. Almost 120,000 Japanese Americans and resident Japanese aliens were eventually removed from their homes on the West Coast and Southern Arizona as part of the single largest forced relocation in U.S. history. 

Most of these camps/residences, gardens, and stock areas were placed on Native American reservations, for which the Native Americans were formally compensated. The Native American councils disputed the amounts negotiated in absentia by US government authorities. They later sued to gain relief and additional compensation for some items of dispute.

Under the National Student Council Relocation Program (supported primarily by the American Friends Service Committee), students of college age were permitted to leave the camps to attend institutions willing to accept students of Japanese ancestry. Although the program initially granted leave permits to a very small number of students, this eventually included 2,263 students by December 31, 1943.

Conditions in the camps
In 1943, Secretary of the Interior Harold L. Ickes wrote "the situation in at least some of the Japanese internment camps is bad and is becoming worse rapidly." The quality of life in the camps was heavily influenced by which government entity was responsible for them. INS Camps were regulated by international treaty. The legal difference between "interned" and relocated had significant effects on those who were imprisoned. INS camps were required to provide food quality and housing at the minimum equal to that experienced by the lowest ranked person in the military.

According to a 1943 War Relocation Authority report, inmates were housed in "tar paper-covered barracks of simple frame construction without plumbing or cooking facilities of any kind". The spartan facilities met international laws, but left much to be desired. Many camps were built quickly by civilian contractors during the summer of 1942 based on designs for military barracks, making the buildings poorly equipped for cramped family living. Throughout many camps, twenty-five people were forced to live in space built to contain four, leaving no room for privacy.

The Heart Mountain War Relocation Center in northwestern Wyoming was a barbed-wire-surrounded enclave with unpartitioned toilets, cots for beds, and a budget of 45 cents daily per capita for food rations.

Armed guards were posted at the camps, which were all in remote, desolate areas far from population centers. Inmates were typically allowed to stay with their families. There are documented instances of guards shooting inmates who reportedly attempted to walk outside the fences. One such shooting, that of James Wakasa at Topaz, led to a re-evaluation of the security measures in the camps. Some camp administrations eventually allowed relatively free movement outside the marked boundaries of the camps. Nearly a quarter of the inmates left the camps to live and work elsewhere in the United States, outside the exclusion zone. Eventually, some were authorized to return to their hometowns in the exclusion zone under supervision of a sponsoring American family or agency whose loyalty had been assured.

The phrase "shikata ga nai" (loosely translated as "it cannot be helped") was commonly used to summarize the incarcerated families' resignation to their helplessness throughout these conditions. This was noticed by their children, as mentioned in the well-known memoir Farewell to Manzanar by Jeanne Wakatsuki Houston and James D. Houston. Further, it is noted that parents may have internalized these emotions to withhold their disappointment and anguish from affecting their children. Nevertheless, children still were cognizant of this emotional repression.

Medical care
Before the war, 87 physicians and surgeons, 137 nurses, 105 dentists, 132 pharmacists, 35 optometrists, and 92 lab technicians provided healthcare to the Japanese American population, with most practicing in urban centers like Los Angeles, San Francisco, and Seattle. As the eviction from the West Coast was carried out, the Wartime Civilian Control Administration worked with the United States Public Health Service (USPHS) and many of these professionals to establish infirmaries within the temporary assembly centers. An Issei doctor was appointed to manage each facility, and additional healthcare staff worked under his supervision, although the USPHS recommendation of one physician for every 1,000 inmates and one nurse to 200 inmates was not met. Overcrowded and unsanitary conditions forced assembly center infirmaries to prioritize inoculations over general care, obstetrics, and surgeries; at Manzanar, for example, hospital staff performed over 40,000 immunizations against typhoid and smallpox. Food poisoning was common and also demanded significant attention. Those who were detained in Topaz, Minidoka, and Jerome experienced outbreaks of dysentery.

Facilities in the more permanent "relocation centers" eventually surpassed the makeshift assembly center infirmaries, but in many cases, these hospitals were incomplete when inmates began to arrive and were not fully functional for several months. Additionally, vital medical supplies such as medications and surgical and sterilization equipment were limited. The staff shortages suffered in the assembly centers continued in the WRA camps. The administration's decision to invert the management structure and demote Japanese American medical workers to positions below white employees, while capping their pay rate at $20/month, further exacerbated this problem. (At Heart Mountain, for example, Japanese American doctors received $19/month compared to white nurses' $150/month.) The war had caused a shortage of healthcare professionals across the country, and the camps often lost potential recruits to outside hospitals that offered better pay and living conditions. When the WRA began to allow some Japanese Americans to leave camp, many Nikkei medical professionals resettled outside the camp. Those who remained had little authority in the administration of the hospitals. Combined with the inequitable payment of salaries between white and Japanese American employees, conflicts arose at several hospitals, and there were two Japanese American walk-outs at Heart Mountain in 1943.

Despite a shortage of healthcare workers, limited access to equipment, and tension between white administrators and Japanese American staff, these hospitals provided much-needed medical care in camp. The extreme climates of the remote incarceration sites were hard on infants and elderly prisoners. The frequent dust storms of the high desert locations led to increased cases of asthma and coccidioidomycosis, while the swampy, mosquito-infested Arkansas camps exposed residents to malaria, all of which were treated in camp. Almost 6,000 live deliveries were performed in these hospitals, and all mothers received pre- and postnatal care. The WRA recorded 1,862 deaths across the ten camps, with cancer, heart disease, tuberculosis, and vascular disease accounting for the majority.

Education

Of the 110,000 Japanese Americans detained by the United States government during World War II, 30,000 were children. Most were school-age children, so educational facilities were set up in the camps. Allowing them to continue their education, however, did not erase the potential for traumatic experiences during their overall time in the camps. The government had not adequately planned for the camps, and no real budget or plan was set aside for the new camp educational facilities. Camp schoolhouses were crowded and had insufficient materials, books, notebooks, and desks for students. Not only that the education/instruction was all in English, the schools in Japanese concentration camps also didn't have any books or supplies to go on as they opened. The state decided to issue a few books only a month after the opening. Wood stoves were used to heat the buildings, and instead of using separate rooms for different kinds of activities only partitions were used to accomplish that. Japanese concentration camps also did not have any libraries (and consequently no library books), writing arm chairs or desks, and no science equipment. These 'schoolhouses' were essentially prison blocks that contained few windows. In the Southwest, when temperatures rose and the schoolhouse filled, the rooms would be sweltering and unbearable. Class sizes were immense. At the height of its attendance, the Rohwer Camp of Arkansas reached 2,339, with only 45 certified teachers. The student to teacher ratio in the camps was 48:1 in elementary schools and 35:1 for secondary schools, compared to the national average of 28:1. This was due to a few things. One of them was that there was a general teacher shortage in the US at the moment, and the fact that the teachers were required to live in those poor conditions in the camps themselves. "There was persistent mud or dust, heat, mosquitoes, poor food and living conditions, inadequate instructional supplies, and a half mile or more walk each day just to and from the school block". Despite the triple salary increase in the concentration camps, they were still unable to fill in all the needed teacher positions with certified personnel, and so in the end they had to hire non-certified teacher detainees to help out the teachers as assistants.

The rhetorical curriculum of the schools was based mostly on the study of "the democratic ideal and to discover its many implications". English compositions researched at the Jerome and Rohwer camps in Arkansas focused on these 'American ideals', and many of the compositions pertained to the camps. Responses were varied, as schoolchildren of the Topaz camp were patriotic and believed in the war effort, but could not ignore the fact of their incarceration. To build patriotism, the Japanese language was banned in the camps, forcing the children to learn English and then go home and teach their Issei parents.

Sports

Although life in the camps was very difficult, Japanese Americans formed many different sports teams, including baseball and football teams. In January 1942, President Franklin D. Roosevelt issued what came to be known as the "Green Light Letter" to MLB Commissioner Kenesaw Mountain Landis, which urged him to continue playing Major League Baseball games despite the ongoing war. In it Roosevelt said that "baseball provides a recreation", and this was true for Japanese American incarcerees as well. Over 100 baseball teams were formed in the Manzanar camp so that Japanese Americans could have some recreation, and some of the team names were carry-overs from teams formed before the incarceration.

Both men and women participated in the sports. In some cases, the Japanese American baseball teams from the camps traveled to outside communities to play other teams. Incarcerees from Idaho competed in the state tournament in 1943, and there were games between the prison guards and the Japanese American teams. Branch Rickey, who would be responsible for bringing Jackie Robinson into Major League Baseball in 1947, sent a letter to all of the WRA camps expressing interest in scouting some of the Nisei players. In the fall of 1943, three players tried out for the Brooklyn Dodgers in front of MLB scout George Sisler, but none of them made the team.

Tule Lake Agricultural Program 
The Tule Lake agricultural program was constructed with the purpose of growing crops in order to feed both detainees in their camp and in the other camps. It is said that any extras would be sold on the open market. The agricultural program was a way for inmates to be employed while at the center, as well as a way for some to learn farming skills. A 4-H program was established to pave a way for children to help the agricultural process at the center. From 1942 through 1945, Tule Lake produced 29 different crops, including Japanese vegetables like daikon, gobo, and nappa.

Student leave to attend Eastern colleges
Japanese-American students were no longer allowed to attend college in the West during the period of Internment, and many found ways to transfer or attend schools in the Midwest and East in order to continue their education.

Most Nisei college students followed their families into camp, but a small number arranged for transfers to schools outside the exclusion zone. Their initial efforts expanded as sympathetic college administrators and the American Friends Service Committee began to coordinate a larger student relocation program. The Friends petitioned WRA Director Milton Eisenhower to place college students in Eastern and Midwestern academic institutions.

The National Japanese American Student Relocation Council was formed on May 29, 1942, and the AFSC administered the program. The acceptance process vetted college students graduating high school students through academic achievement and a questionnaire centering on their relationship with American culture. Some high school students were also able to leave the internment camps through boarding schools. 39 percent of the Nisei students were women. The student's tuition, book costs, and living expenses were absorbed by the U.S. government, private foundations (such as the Columbia Foundation and the Carnegie Corporation) and church scholarships, in addition to significant fundraising efforts led by Issei parents in camp.

Outside camp, the students took on the role of "ambassadors of good will", and the NJASRC and WRA promoted this image to soften anti-Japanese prejudice and prepare the public for the resettlement of Japanese Americans in their communities. Some students worked as domestic workers in nearby communities during the school year.

At Earlham College, President William Dennis helped institute a program that enrolled several dozen Japanese-American students in order to spare them from incarceration. While this action was controversial in Richmond, Indiana, it helped strengthen the college's ties to Japan and the Japanese-American community. At Park College in Missouri, Dr. William Lindsay Young attempted to get Nisei students enrolled despite backlash from the greater Parkville city.

At Oberlin College, about 40 evacuated Nisei students were enrolled. One of them, Kenji Okuda, was elected as student council president. Three Nisei students were enrolled at Mount Holyoke College during World War 2.

In total, over 600 institutions east of the exclusion zone opened their doors to more than 4,000 college-age youth who had been placed behind barbed wire, many of whom were enrolled in West Coast schools prior to their removal.

Incomplete list of schools attended by Japanese Americans during their period of internment: 
Berea College

Boston University

Colorado State University

Columbia University

Connecticut College

Cornell

Harvard

Hunter College

Iowa State

McFierson College

Mount Holyoke College

National College in Kansas City

New York University

The Ohio State University

Parsons College

Simpson College

Smith University

University of Chicago

University of Colorado

University of Illinois

University of Michigan

University of Minnesota

University of Missouri

University of Nebraska

University of Oregon

University of Utah

University of Texas

University of Wisconsin

Vassar College

Washington University in St. Louis

Wesleyan College

Wheaton College

Yale

Nisei Attending Eastern colleges at the End of WWII 
The NJASRC ceased operations on June 7, 1946. After the internment camps had been shut down, releasing many Issei parents with little belongings, many families followed the college students to the eastern cities where they attended school. In 1980, former Nisei students formed the NSRC Nisei Student Relocation Commemorative Fund. In 2021, The University of Southern California apologized for discriminating against Nisei students. It issued posthumous degrees to the students whose educations were cut short or illegitimated, having already issued degrees to those surviving.

Loyalty questions and segregation

In early 1943, War Relocation Authority officials, working with the War Department and the Office of Naval Intelligence, circulated a questionnaire in an attempt to determine the loyalty of incarcerated Nisei men they hoped to recruit into military service. The "Statement of United States Citizen of Japanese Ancestry" was initially given only to Nisei who were eligible for service (or would have been, but for the 4-C classification imposed on them at the start of the war). Authorities soon revised the questionnaire and required all adults in camp to complete the form. Most of the 28 questions were designed to assess the "Americanness" of the respondent — had they been educated in Japan or the U.S.? were they Buddhist or Christian? did they practice judo or play on a baseball team? The final two questions on the form, which soon came to be known as the "loyalty questionnaire", were more direct:

Across the camps, people who answered No to both questions became known as "No Nos".

While most camp inmates simply answered "yes" to both questions, several thousand — 17 percent of the total respondents, 20 percent of the Nisei — gave negative or qualified replies out of confusion, fear or anger at the wording and implications of the questionnaire. In regard to Question 27, many worried that expressing a willingness to serve would be equated with volunteering for combat, while others felt insulted at being asked to risk their lives for a country that had imprisoned them and their families. An affirmative answer to Question 28 brought up other issues. Some believed that renouncing their loyalty to Japan would suggest that they had at some point been loyal to Japan and disloyal to the United States. Many believed they were to be deported to Japan no matter how they answered; they feared an explicit disavowal of the Emperor would become known and make such resettlement extremely difficult.

On July 15, 1943, Tule Lake, the site with the highest number of "no" responses to the questionnaire, was designated to house inmates whose answers suggested they were "disloyal". During the remainder of 1943 and into early 1944, more than 12,000 men, women and children were transferred from other camps to the maximum-security Tule Lake Segregation Center.

Afterward, the government passed the Renunciation Act of 1944, a law that made it possible for Nisei and Kibei to renounce their American citizenship. A total of 5,589 detainees opted to do so; 5,461 of these were sent to Tule Lake. Of those who renounced US citizenship, 1,327 were repatriated to Japan. Those persons who stayed in the US faced discrimination from the Japanese-American community, both during and after the war, for having made that choice of renunciation. At the time, they feared what their futures held were they to remain American, and remain incarcerated.

These renunciations of American citizenship have been highly controversial, for a number of reasons. Some apologists for incarceration have cited the renunciations as evidence that "disloyalty" or anti-Americanism was well represented among the incarcerated peoples, thereby justifying the incarceration. Many historians have dismissed the latter argument, for its failure to consider that the small number of individuals in question had been mistreated and persecuted by their own government at the time of the "renunciation":

[T]he renunciations had little to do with "loyalty" or "disloyalty" to the United States, but were instead the result of a series of complex conditions and factors that were beyond the control of those involved. Prior to discarding citizenship, most or all of the renunciants had experienced the following misfortunes: forced removal from homes; loss of jobs; government and public assumption of disloyalty to the land of their birth based on race alone; and incarceration in a "segregation center" for "disloyal" ISSEI or NISEI...

Minoru Kiyota, who was among those who renounced his citizenship and soon came to regret the decision, has said that he wanted only "to express my fury toward the government of the United States", for his internment and for the mental and physical duress, as well as the intimidation, he was made to face.

Civil rights attorney Wayne M. Collins successfully challenged most of these renunciations as invalid, owing to the conditions of duress and intimidation under which the government obtained them. Many of the deportees were Issei (first generation) or Kibei, who often had difficulty with English and often did not understand the questions they were asked. Even among those Issei who had a clear understanding, Question 28 posed an awkward dilemma: Japanese immigrants were denied U.S. citizenship at the time, so when asked to renounce their Japanese citizenship, answering "Yes" would have made them stateless persons.

When the government began seeking army volunteers from among the camps, only 6% of military-aged male inmates volunteered to serve in the U.S. Armed Forces. Most of those who refused tempered that refusal with statements of willingness to fight if they were restored their rights as American citizens. Eventually 33,000 Japanese-American men and many Japanese-American women served in the U.S. military during World War II, of which 20,000 served in the U.S. Army.

The 100th Infantry Battalion, which was formed in June 1942 with 1,432 men of Japanese descent from the Hawaii National Guard, was sent to Camps McCoy and Shelby for advanced training. Because of the 100th's superior training record, the War Department authorized the formation of the 442nd Regimental Combat Team. When the call was made, 10,000 young men from Hawaii volunteered with eventually 2,686 being chosen along with 1,500 from the continental U.S. The 100th Infantry Battalion landed in Salerno, Italy in September 1943 and became known as the Purple Heart Battalion. This legendary outfit was joined by the 442nd RCT in June 1944, and this combined unit became the most highly decorated U.S. military unit of its size and duration in U.S. military history. The 442nd's Nisei segregated field artillery battalion, then on detached service within the U.S. Army in Bavaria, liberated at least one of the satellite labor camps of the Nazis' original Dachau concentration camp on April 29, 1945, and only days later, on May 2, halted a death march in southern Bavaria.

Proving commitment to the United States
Many Nisei worked to prove themselves as loyal American citizens. Of the 20,000 Japanese Americans who served in the Army during World War II, "many Japanese-American soldiers had gone to war to fight racism at home" and they were "proving with their blood, their limbs, and their bodies that they were truly American". Some one hundred Nisei women volunteered for the WAC (Women's Army Corps), where, after undergoing rigorous basic training, they had assignments as typists, clerks, and drivers. A smaller number of women also volunteered to serve as nurses for the ANC (Army Nurse Corps). Satoshi Ito, an incarceration camp inmate, reinforces the idea of the immigrants' children striving to demonstrate their patriotism to the United States. He notes that his mother would tell him, "'you're here in the United States, you need to do well in school, you need to prepare yourself to get a good job when you get out into the larger society'". He said she would tell him, "'don't be a dumb farmer like me, like us'" to encourage Ito to successfully assimilate into American society. As a result, he worked exceptionally hard to excel in school and later became a professor at the College of William & Mary. His story, along with the countless Japanese Americans willing to risk their lives in war, demonstrate the lengths many in their community went to prove their American patriotism.

Other concentration camps

As early as September 1931, after the Japanese invasion of Manchuria, US officials began to compile lists of individuals, lists which were particularly focused on the Issei. This data was eventually included in the Custodial Detention index (CDI). Agents in the Department of Justice's Special Defense Unit classified the subjects into three groups: A, B, and C, with A being the "most dangerous", and C being "possibly dangerous".

After the attack on Pearl Harbor, Roosevelt authorized his attorney general to put a plan for the arrest of thousands of individuals whose names were on the potential enemy alien lists into motion, most of these individuals were Japanese-American community leaders. Armed with a blanket arrest warrant, the FBI seized these men on the eve of December 8, 1941. These men were held in municipal jails and prisons until they were moved to Department of Justice detention camps, these camps were separate from the camps which were operated by the Wartime Relocation Authority (WRA). These camps were operated under far more stringent conditions and they were also patrolled by heightened criminal-style guards, despite the absence of criminal proceedings. Memoirs about the camps include those by Keiho Soga and Toru Matsumoto.

Crystal City, Texas, was one such camp where Japanese Americans, German Americans, Italian Americans, were interned along with a large number of Axis-descended nationals who were seized from several Latin-American countries by the U.S.

The Canadian government also confined its citizens with Japanese ancestry during World War II (see Internment of Japanese Canadians), for many reasons which were also based on fear and prejudice. Some Latin American countries on the Pacific Coast, such as Peru, interned ethnic Japanese or sent them to the United States for incarceration. Brazil also imposed restrictions on its ethnic Japanese population.

Hawaii
Although Japanese Americans in Hawaii comprised more than one-third of Hawaii's entire population, businessmen prevented their incarceration or deportation to the concentration camps which were located on the mainland, because they recognized their contributions to Hawaii's economy. In the hysteria of the time, some mainland Congressmen (Hawaii was only an incorporated U.S. territory at the time, and despite being fully part of the U.S., did not have a voting representative or senator in Congress) promoted that all Japanese Americans and Japanese immigrants should be removed from Hawaii but were unsuccessful. An estimated 1,200 to 1,800 Japanese nationals and American-born Japanese from Hawaii were interned or incarcerated, either in five camps on the islands or in one of the mainland concentration camps, but this represented well-under two percent of the total Japanese American residents in the islands. "No serious explanations were offered as to why ... the internment of individuals of Japanese descent was necessary on the mainland, but not in Hawaii, where the large Japanese-Hawaiian population went largely unmolested."

The vast majority of Japanese Americans and their immigrant parents in Hawaii were not incarcerated because the government had already declared martial law in Hawaii, a legal measure which allowed it to significantly reduce the supposed risks of espionage and sabotage by residents of Hawaii who had Japanese ancestry. Also, Japanese Americans comprised over 35% of the territory's entire population: they numbered 157,905 out of a total population of 423,330 at the time of the 1940 census, making them the largest ethnic group at that time; detaining so many people would have been enormously challenging in terms of logistics. Additionally, the whole of Hawaiian society was dependent on their productivity. According to intelligence reports which were published at the time, "the Japanese, through a concentration of effort in select industries, had achieved a virtual stranglehold on several key sectors of the economy in Hawaii," and they "had access to virtually all jobs in the economy, including high-status, high-paying jobs (e.g., professional and managerial jobs)". To imprison such a large percentage of the islands' work force would have crippled the Hawaiian economy. Thus, the unfounded fear of Japanese Americans turning against the United States was overcome by the reality-based fear of massive economic loss.

Lieutenant General Delos C. Emmons, the commander of the Hawaii Department, promised that the local Japanese-American community would be treated fairly as long as it remained loyal to the United States. He succeeded in blocking efforts to relocate it to the outer islands or the mainland by pointing out the logistical difficulties of such a move. Among the small number incarcerated were community leaders and prominent politicians, including territorial legislators Thomas Sakakihara and Sanji Abe.

A total of five concentration camps were operated in the territory of Hawaii, they were referred to as the "Hawaiian Island Detention Camps". One camp was located on Sand Island, at the mouth of Honolulu Harbor. This camp was constructed before the outbreak of the war. All of the prisoners who were held there were "detained under military custody... because of the imposition of martial law throughout the Islands". Another Hawaiian camp was the Honouliuli Internment Camp, near Ewa, on the southwestern shore of Oahu; it was opened in 1943 and it served as a replacement for the Sand Island camp. Another was located on the island of Maui in the town of Haiku, in addition to the Kilauea Detention Center on Hawaii and Camp Kalaheo on Kauai.

Japanese Latin Americans
During World War II, over 2,200 Japanese from Latin America were held in concentration camps run by the Immigration and Naturalization Service, part of the Department of Justice. Beginning in 1942, Latin Americans of Japanese ancestry were rounded up and transported to American concentration camps run by the INS and the U.S. Justice Department. Most of these internees, approximately 1,800, came from Peru. An additional 250 were from Panama, Bolivia, Colombia, Costa Rica, Cuba, Ecuador, El Salvador, Mexico, Nicaragua, and Venezuela.

The first group of Japanese Latin Americans arrived in San Francisco on April 20, 1942, on board the Etolin along with 360 ethnic Germans and 14 ethnic Italians from Peru, Ecuador, and Colombia. The 151 men — ten from Ecuador, the rest from Peru — had volunteered for deportation believing they were to be repatriated to Japan. They were denied visas by U.S. Immigration authorities and then detained on the grounds they had tried to enter the country illegally, without a visa or passport. Subsequent transports brought additional "volunteers", including the wives and children of men who had been deported earlier. A total of 2,264 Japanese Latin Americans, about two-thirds of them from Peru, were interned in facilities on the U.S. mainland during the war.

The United States originally intended to trade these Latin American internees as part of a hostage exchange program with Japan and other Axis nations. A thorough examination of the documents shows at least one trade occurred. Over 1,300 persons of Japanese ancestry were exchanged for a like number of non-official Americans in October 1943, at the port of Marmagao, India. Over half were Japanese Latin Americans (the rest being ethnic Germans and Italians) and of that number one-third were Japanese Peruvians.

On September 2, 1943, the Swedish ship MS Gripsholm departed the U.S. with just over 1,300 Japanese nationals (including nearly a hundred from Canada and Mexico) en route for the exchange location, Marmagao, the main port of the Portuguese colony of Goa on the west coast of India. After two more stops in South America to take on additional Japanese nationals, the passenger manifest reached 1,340. Of that number, Latin American Japanese numbered 55 percent of the Gripsholm's travelers, 30 percent of whom were Japanese Peruvian. Arriving in Marmagao on October 16, 1943, the Gripsholm's passengers disembarked and then boarded the Japanese ship Teia Maru. In return, "non-official" Americans (secretaries, butlers, cooks, embassy staff workers, etc.) previously held by the Japanese Army boarded the Gripsholm while the Teia Maru headed for Tokyo. Because this exchange was done with those of Japanese ancestry officially described as "volunteering" to return to Japan, no legal challenges were encountered. The U.S. Department of State was pleased with the first trade and immediately began to arrange a second exchange of non-officials for February 1944. This exchange would involve 1,500 non-volunteer Japanese who were to be exchanged for 1,500 Americans. The US was busy with Pacific Naval activity and future trading plans stalled. Further slowing the program were legal and political "turf" battles between the State Department, the Roosevelt administration, and the DOJ, whose officials were not convinced of the legality of the program.

The completed October 1943 trade took place at the height of the Enemy Alien Deportation Program. Japanese Peruvians were still being "rounded up" for shipment to the U.S. in previously unseen numbers. Despite logistical challenges facing the floundering prisoner exchange program, deportation plans were moving ahead. This is partly explained by an early-in-the-war revelation of the overall goal for Latin Americans of Japanese ancestry under the Enemy Alien Deportation Program. The goal: that the hemisphere was to be free of Japanese. Secretary of State Cordell Hull wrote an agreeing President Roosevelt, "[that the US must] continue our efforts to remove all the Japanese from these American Republics for internment in the United States."

"Native" Peruvians expressed extreme animosity toward their Japanese citizens and expatriates, and Peru refused to accept the post-war return of Japanese Peruvians from the US. Although a small number asserting special circumstances, such as marriage to a non-Japanese Peruvian, did return, the majority were trapped. Their home country refused to take them back (a political stance Peru would maintain until 1950), they were generally Spanish speakers in the Anglo US, and in the postwar U.S., the Department of State started expatriating them to Japan. Civil rights attorney Wayne Collins filed injunctions on behalf of the remaining internees, helping them obtain "parole" relocation to the labor-starved Seabrook Farms in New Jersey. He started a legal battle that would not be resolved until 1953, when, after working as undocumented immigrants for almost ten years, those Japanese Peruvians remaining in the U.S. were finally offered citizenship.

Incarceration ends
On December 18, 1944, the Supreme Court handed down two decisions on the legality of the incarceration under Executive Order 9066. Korematsu v. United States, a 6–3 decision upholding a Nisei's conviction for violating the military exclusion order, stated that, in general, the removal of Japanese Americans from the West Coast was constitutional. However, Ex parte Endo unanimously declared on that same day that loyal citizens of the United States, regardless of cultural descent, could not be detained without cause. In effect, the two rulings held that, while the eviction of American citizens in the name of military necessity was legal, the subsequent incarceration was not—thus paving the way for their release.

Having been alerted to the Court's decision, the Roosevelt administration issued Public Proclamation No. 21 the day before the Korematsu and Endo rulings were made public, on December 17, 1944, rescinding the exclusion orders and declaring that Japanese Americans could return to the West Coast the next month.

Although WRA Director Dillon Myer and others had pushed for an earlier end to the incarceration, the Japanese Americans were not allowed to return to the West Coast until January 2, 1945, being postponed until after the November 1944 election, so as not to impede Roosevelt's reelection campaign. Many younger detainees had already "resettled" in Midwest or Eastern cities to pursue work or educational opportunities. (For example, 20,000 were sent to Lake View in Chicago.) The remaining population began to leave the camps to try to rebuild their lives at home. Former inmates were given $25 and a train ticket to their pre-war places of residence, but many had little or nothing to return to, having lost their homes and businesses. When Japanese Americans were sent to the camps they could only take a few items with them and while incarcerated they could only work for meager jobs with a small monthly salary of $12–$19. So when incarceration ended Japanese Americans not only couldn't return to their homes and businesses but they had little to nothing to survive on, let alone enough to start a new life. Some emigrated to Japan, although many of these individuals were "repatriated" against their will. The camps remained open for residents who were not ready to return (mostly elderly Issei and families with young children), but the WRA pressured stragglers to leave by gradually eliminating services in camp. Those who had not left by each camp's close date were forcibly removed and sent back to the West Coast.

Nine of the ten WRA camps were shut down by the end of 1945, although Tule Lake, which held "renunciants" slated for deportation to Japan, was not closed until March 20, 1946. Japanese Latin Americans brought to the U.S. from Peru and other countries, who were still being held in the DOJ camps at Santa Fe and Crystal City, took legal action in April 1946 in an attempt to avoid deportation to Japan.

Aftermath

Hardship and material loss

Many detainees lost irreplaceable personal property due to restrictions that prohibited them from taking more than they could carry into the camps. These losses were compounded by theft and destruction of items placed in governmental storage. Many others were simply fired for their Japanese heritage.

Many Japanese Americans encountered continued housing injustice after the war. Alien land laws in California, Oregon, and Washington barred the Issei from owning their pre-war homes and farms. Many had cultivated land for decades as tenant farmers, but they lost their rights to farm those lands when they were forced to leave. Other Issei (and Nisei who were renting or had not completed payments on their property) had found families willing to occupy their homes or tend their farms during their incarceration. However, those unable to strike a deal with caretakers had to sell their property, often in a matter of days and at great financial loss to predatory land speculators, who made huge profits.

In addition to these monetary and property losses, there were seven who were shot and killed by sentries: Kanesaburo Oshima, 58, during an escape attempt from Fort Sill, Oklahoma; Toshio Kobata, 58, and Hirota Isomura, 59, during transfer to Lordsburg, New Mexico; James Ito, 17, and Katsuji James Kanegawa, 21, during the December 1942 Manzanar Riot; James Hatsuaki Wakasa, 65, while walking near the perimeter wire of Topaz; and Shoichi James Okamoto, 30, during a verbal altercation with a sentry at the Tule Lake Segregation Center.

Psychological injury was observed by Dillon S. Myer, director of the WRA camps. In June 1945, Myer described how the Japanese Americans had grown increasingly depressed, and overcome with feelings of helplessness and personal insecurity. Author Betty Furuta explains that the Japanese used gaman, loosely meaning "perseverance", to overcome hardships; this was mistaken by non-Japanese as being introverted and lacking initiative.

Japanese Americans also encountered hostility and even violence when they returned to the West Coast. Concentrated largely in rural areas of Central California, there were dozens of reports of gunshots, fires, and explosions aimed at Japanese American homes, businesses, and places of worship, in addition to non-violent crimes like vandalism and the defacing of Japanese graves. In one of the few cases to go to trial, four men were accused of attacking the Doi family of Placer County, California, setting off an explosion, and starting a fire on the family's farm in January 1945. Despite a confession from one of the men that implicated the others, the jury accepted their defense attorney's framing of the attack as a justifiable attempt to keep California "a white man's country" and acquitted all four defendants.

To compensate former detainees for their property losses, Congress passed the Japanese-American Claims Act on July 2, 1948, allowing Japanese Americans to apply for compensation for property losses which occurred as "a reasonable and natural consequence of the evacuation or exclusion". By the time the Act was passed, the IRS had already destroyed most of the detainees' 1939–42 tax records. Due to the time pressure and strict limits on how much they could take to the camps, few were able to preserve detailed tax and financial records during the evacuation process. Therefore, it was extremely difficult for claimants to establish that their claims were valid. Under the Act, Japanese American families filed 26,568 claims totaling $148 million in requests; about $37 million was approved and disbursed.

The different placement for the detainees had significant consequences for their lifetime outcomes. A 2016 study finds, using the random dispersal of detainees into camps in seven different states, that the people assigned to richer locations did better in terms of income, education, socioeconomic status, house prices, and housing quality roughly fifty years later.

Reparations and redress

Beginning in the 1960s, a younger generation of Japanese Americans, inspired by the civil rights movement, began what is known as the "Redress Movement", an effort to obtain an official apology and reparations from the federal government for incarcerating their parents and grandparents during the war. They focused not on documented property losses but on the broader injustice and mental suffering caused by the incarceration. The movement's first success was in 1976, when President Gerald Ford proclaimed that the incarceration was "wrong", and a "national mistake" which "shall never again be repeated". President Ford signed a proclamation formally terminating Executive Order 9066 and apologized for the incarceration, stating: "We now know what we should have known then—not only was that evacuation wrong but Japanese-Americans were and are loyal Americans. On the battlefield and at home the names of Japanese-Americans have been and continue to be written in history for the sacrifices and the contributions they have made to the well-being and to the security of this, our common Nation."

The campaign for redress was launched by Japanese Americans in 1978. The Japanese American Citizens League (JACL), which had cooperated with the administration during the war, became part of the movement. It asked for three measures: $25,000 to be awarded to each person who was detained, an apology from Congress acknowledging publicly that the U.S. government had been wrong, and the release of funds to set up an educational foundation for the children of Japanese-American families.

In 1980, under the Carter administration, Congress established the Commission on Wartime Relocation and Internment of Civilians (CWRIC) to study the matter. On February 24, 1983, the commission issued a report entitled Personal Justice Denied, condemning the incarceration as unjust and motivated by racism and xenophobic ideas rather than factual military necessity. Concentration camp survivors sued the federal government for $24 million in property loss, but lost the case. However, the Commission recommended that $20,000 in reparations be paid to those Japanese Americans who had suffered incarceration.

The Civil Liberties Act of 1988 exemplified the Japanese American redress movement that impacted the large debate about the reparation bill. There was question over whether the bill would pass during the 1980s due to the poor state of the federal budget and the low support of Japanese Americans covering 1% of the United States. However, four powerful Japanese-American Democrats and Republicans who had war experience, with the support of Democratic congressmen Barney Frank, sponsored the bill and pushed for its passage as their top priority.

On August 10, 1988, U.S. President Ronald Reagan signed the Civil Liberties Act of 1988, which had been sponsored by several representatives including Barney Frank, Norman Mineta, and Bob Matsui in the House and by Spark Matsunaga who got 75 co-sponsors in the Senate, provided financial redress of $20,000 for each former detainee who was still alive when the act was passed, totaling $1.2 billion. The question of to whom reparations should be given, how much, and even whether monetary reparations were appropriate were subjects of sometimes contentious debate within the Japanese American community and Congress.

On September 27, 1992, the Civil Liberties Act Amendments of 1992, appropriating an additional $400 million to ensure all remaining detainee received their $20,000 redress payments, was signed into law by President George H. W. Bush. He issued another formal apology from the U.S. government on December 7, 1991, on the 50th anniversary of the Pearl Harbor attack, saying:
In remembering, it is important to come to grips with the past. No nation can fully understand itself or find its place in the world if it does not look with clear eyes at all the glories and disgraces of its past. We in the United States acknowledge such an injustice in our history. The internment of Americans of Japanese ancestry was a great injustice, and it will never be repeated.

Over 81,800 people qualified by 1998 and $1.6 billion was distributed among them.

Under the 2001 budget of the United States, Congress authorized the preservation of ten detention sites as historical landmarks: "places like Manzanar, Tule Lake, Heart Mountain, Topaz, Amache, Jerome, and Rohwer will forever stand as reminders that this nation failed in its most sacred duty to protect its citizens against prejudice, greed, and political expediency".

President Bill Clinton awarded the Presidential Medal of Freedom, the highest civilian honor in the United States, to Korematsu in 1998, saying, "In the long history of our country's constant search for justice, some names of ordinary citizens stand for millions of souls: Plessy, Brown, Parks ... to that distinguished list, today we add the name of Fred Korematsu." That year, Korematsu served as the Grand Marshal of San Francisco's annual Cherry Blossom Festival parade. On January 30, 2011, California first observed an annual "Fred Korematsu Day of Civil Liberties and the Constitution", the first such ceremony ever to be held in commemoration of an Asian American in the United States. On June 14, 2011, Peruvian President Alan García apologized for his country's internment of Japanese immigrants during World War II, most of whom were transferred to the U.S.

Terminology debate

Misuse of the term "internment"
The legal term "internment" has been used in regards to the mass incarceration of Japanese Americans. This term, however, derives from international conventions regarding the treatment of enemy nationals during wartime and specifically limits internment to those (noncitizen) enemy nationals who threaten the security of the detaining power. The internment of selected enemy alien belligerents, as opposed to mass incarceration, is legal both under US and international law. UCLA Asian American studies professor Lane Hirabayashi pointed out that the history of the term internment, to mean the arrest and holding of non-citizens, could only be correctly applied to Issei, Japanese people who were not legal citizens. These people were a minority during Japanese incarceration and thus Roger Daniels, emeritus professor of history at the University of Cincinnati, has concluded that this terminology is wrongfully used by any government that wishes to include groups other than the Issei.

Which term to use
During World War II, the camps were referred to both as relocation centers and concentration camps by government officials and in the press. Roosevelt himself referred to the camps as concentration camps on different occasions, including at a press conference held on October 20, 1942. In 1943, his attorney general Francis Biddle lamented that "The present practice of keeping loyal American citizens in concentration camps for longer than is necessary is dangerous and repugnant to the principles of our government."

Following World War II, other government officials made statements suggesting that the use of the term "relocation center" had been largely euphemistic. In 1946, former Secretary of the Interior Harold Ickes wrote "We gave the fancy name of 'relocation centers' to these dust bowls, but they were concentration camps nonetheless." In a 1961 interview, Harry S. Truman stated "They were
concentration camps. They called it relocation but they put them in concentration camps, and I was against it. We were in a period of emergency, but it was still the wrong thing to do."

In subsequent decades, debate has arisen over the terminology used to refer to camps in which Americans of Japanese ancestry and their immigrant parents, were incarcerated by the US government during the war. These camps have been referred to as "war relocation centers", "relocation camps", "relocation centers", "internment camps", and "concentration camps", and the controversy over which term is the most accurate and appropriate continues.

On April 22, 2022, The Associated Press edited its entry for Japanese internment, changing the entry heading to Japanese internment, incarceration, and adding the following wording:Though internment has been applied historically to all detainments of Japanese Americans and Japanese nationals during World War II, the broader use of the term is inaccurate—about two-thirds of those who were relocated US citizens and thus could not be considered interns—and many Japanese-Americans find it objectionable.

It is better to say that they were incarcerated or detained and to define the larger event as the incarceration of Japanese Americans.

Towards a consensus
In 1998, the use of the term "concentration camps" gained greater credibility prior to the opening of an exhibit about the American camps at Ellis Island. Initially, the American Jewish Committee (AJC) and the National Park Service, which manages Ellis Island, objected to the use of the term in the exhibit. However, during a subsequent meeting held at the offices of the AJC in New York City, leaders representing Japanese Americans and Jewish Americans reached an understanding about the use of the term. After the meeting, the Japanese American National Museum and the AJC issued a joint statement (which was included in the exhibit) that read in part:The New York Times published an unsigned editorial supporting the use of "concentration camp" in the exhibit. An article quoted Jonathan Mark, a columnist for The Jewish Week, who wrote, "Can no one else speak of slavery, gas, trains, camps? It's Jewish malpractice to monopolize pain and minimize victims." AJC Executive Director David A. Harris stated during the controversy, "We have not claimed Jewish exclusivity for the term 'concentration camps.'", while also stating "Since the Second World War, these terms have taken on a specificity and a new level of meaning that deserves protection. A certain care needs to be exercised."
Deborah Schiffrin has written that at the opening of the exhibition, entitled 'America's Concentration Camps: Remembering the Japanese-American experience', 'some Jewish groups' had been offended at the use of the term as after the horrors of the Holocaust some survivors feel an ownership over the semantics. However, Schiffrin also notes that a compromise was reached when an appropriate footnote was added to the exhibit brochure.

On the rejection of euphemisms
On July 7, 2012, at its annual convention, the National Council of the Japanese American Citizens League unanimously ratified the Power of Words Handbook, calling for the use of "...truthful and accurate terms, and retiring the misleading euphemisms created by the government to cover up the denial of Constitutional and human rights, the force, oppressive conditions, and racism against 120,000 innocent people of Japanese ancestry locked up in America's World War II concentration camps."

Comparisons

The incarceration of Japanese Americans has been compared to Canada's incarceration of Japanese-Canadians, the internal deportation of Ethnically Volga German Soviet citizens from the western USSR to Soviet Central Asia, and the persecutions, expulsions, and dislocations of other ethnic minority groups which also occurred during World War II, both in Europe and Asia.

Notable individuals who were incarcerated

George Takei, American actor famed for his role as Sulu in Star Trek, was incarcerated at Rohwer and Tule Lake concentration camps between the ages of 5 and 8. He reflected these experiences in the 2019 series The Terror: Infamy. Takei has also recounted his time in an concentration camp in a graphic novel titled They Called Us Enemy.
Pat Morita, American actor who played the role of "Mr. Miyagi" in The Karate Kid. He and his family were incarcerated at Gila River.
Isamu Noguchi, a Japanese American sculptor, decided to voluntarily relocate to Poston, Arizona from New York but eventually asked to be released because of the conditions and alienation from the Japanese American community in camp.
Aiko Herzig-Yoshinaga
Norman Y. Mineta, U.S. Representative from San Jose, Secretary of Commerce under Clinton, and Secretary of Transportation under Bush.

Legacy

Cultural legacy

Exhibitions and collections

 The Smithsonian Institution's National Museum of American History has more than 800 artifacts from its "A More Perfect Union" collection available online. Archival photography, publications, original manuscripts, artworks, and handmade objects comprise the collection of items related to the Japanese American experience.
 On October 1, 1987, the Smithsonian Institution National Museum of American History opened an exhibition called, "A More Perfect Union: Japanese Americans and the U.S. Constitution". The exhibition examined the Constitutional process by considering the experiences of Americans of Japanese ancestry before, during, and after World War II. On view were more than 1,000 artifacts and photographs relating to the experiences of Japanese Americans during World War II. The exhibition closed on January 11, 2004. On November 8, 2011, the National Museum of American History launched an online exhibition of the same name with shared content.
 In September 2022, the Japanese American National Museum created a project in which every single person with Japanese ancestry who was incarcerated in an interment camp (over 125,000 names) is displayed in a printed book of names, called the Ireichō, a website known as the Ireizō (ireizo.com), and a light sculpture called Ireihi.
 Following recognition of the injustices done to Japanese Americans, in 1992 Manzanar camp was designated a National Historic Site to "provide for the protection and interpretation of historic, cultural, and natural resources associated with the relocation of Japanese Americans during World War II" (Public Law 102-248). In 2001, the site of the Minidoka War Relocation Center in Idaho was designated the Minidoka National Historic Site.
 The elementary school at Poston Camp Unit 1, the only surviving school complex at one of the camps and the only major surviving element of the Poston camp, was designated a National Historic Landmark District in 2012.
 On April 16, 2013, the Japanese American Internment Museum was opened in McGehee, Arkansas regarding the history of two concentration camps.
 In January 2015, the Topaz Museum opened in Delta, Utah. Its stated mission is "to preserve the Topaz site and the history of the internment experience during World War II; to interpret its impact on the internees, their families, and the citizens of Millard County; and to educate the public in order to prevent a recurrence of a similar denial of American civil rights".
 On June 29, 2017, in Chicago, Illinois, the Alphawood Gallery, in partnership with the Japanese American Service Committee, opened "Then They Came for Me", the largest exhibition on Japanese American incarceration and postwar resettlement ever to open in the Midwest. This exhibit was scheduled to run until November 19, 2017.

Sculpture

Nina Akamu, a Sansei, created the sculpture entitled Golden Cranes of two red-crowned cranes, which became the center feature of the Japanese American Memorial to Patriotism During World War II. The U.S. Department of Defense described the November 9, 2000, dedication of the Memorial: "Drizzling rain was mixed with tears streaming down the faces of Japanese American World War II heroes and those who spent the war years imprisoned in isolated internment camps." Akamu's family's connection to the concentration camps based on the experience of her maternal grandfather, who was interned and later died in a concentration camp in Hawaii—combined with the fact that she grew up in Hawaii for a time, where she fished with her father at Pearl Harbor—and the erection of a Japanese American war memorial near her home in Massa, Italy, inspired a strong connection to the Memorial and its creation.

United States Attorney General Janet Reno also spoke at the dedication of the Memorial, where she shared a letter from President Clinton stating: "We are diminished when any American is targeted unfairly because of his or her heritage. This Memorial and the internment sites are powerful reminders that stereotyping, discrimination, hatred and racism have no place in this country."

According to the National Japanese American Memorial Foundation, the memorial:

...is symbolic not only of the Japanese American experience, but of the extrication of anyone from deeply painful and restrictive circumstances. It reminds us of the battles we've fought to overcome our ignorance and prejudice and the meaning of an integrated culture, once pained and torn, now healed and unified. Finally, the monument presents the Japanese American experience as a symbol for all peoples.

Films

Dozens of movies were filmed about and in the concentration camps; these relate the experiences of inmates or were made by former camp inmates. Examples follow.
 The film Bad Day at Black Rock (1955) is about the wartime bias against Japanese Americans.
 In The Karate Kid (1984), Ralph Macchio's character, Daniel, discovers a box containing references to the deaths of Mr. Miyagi's wife and child in the Manzanar camp, and to Mr. Miyagi (Pat Morita's character) being awarded the Medal of Honor while serving with the 442nd Infantry Regiment.
 The movie Come See The Paradise (1990), written and directed by Alan Parker, tells the story of a European American man who elopes with a Japanese American woman and their subsequent incarceration following the outbreak of war.
 The documentary Days of Waiting (1990), by Steven Okazaki, is about a white artist, Estelle Ishigo, who voluntarily joined her Japanese-American husband at a concentration camp. Inspired by Ishigo's book Lone Heart Mountain, it won an Academy Award for Best Documentary and a Peabody Award.
 The film Looking for Jiro (2011), by visual studies scholar and performance artist Tina Takemoto, explores queerness and homosexual desire in concentration camps, focusing on Jiro Onuma, a gay bachelor from San Francisco incarcerated at the Topaz War Relocation Center. The collection of Onuma's photographs and personal belongings is held by the GLBT Historical Society in San Francisco.
 Greg Chaney's documentary film The Empty Chair (2014) recounts the forced removal and incarceration of Japanese Americans from Juneau, Alaska and how the community stood in quiet defiance against such policies.
 The documentary The Legacy of Heart Mountain (2014) explores the experience of life at the Heart Mountain concentration camp in Cody, Wyoming.
 The documentary film To Be Takei (2014) chronicles the early life of actor George Takei, who spent several years in a concentration camp.
 The feature film Under the Blood Red Sun (2014), by Japanese-American director Tim Savage and based on Graham Salisbury's novel of the same name, examines the life of a 13-year-old Japanese-American boy living in Hawaii whose father is interned after the Japanese bomb Pearl Harbor.
 Vivienne Schiffer's documentary film Relocation, Arkansas (2015) explores the aftermath of incarceration in the Rohwer and Jerome concentration camps in Arkansas.

Literature

Many books and novels were written by and about Japanese Americans' experience during and after their residence in concentration camps among them can be mentioned the followed:
 Isabel Allende's novel The Japanese Lover (2017) presents the lifelong love affair between two immigrants, one of whom is Japanese American and who is sent along with his whole family to an concentration camp.
 Jamie Ford's novel Hotel on the Corner of Bitter and Sweet (2009) tells of a Chinese man's search for an Oscar Holden jazz record bought in his childhood with a Japanese friend in Seattle and left behind during World War II, when she and her family were sent to a Japanese American concentration camp.
 David Guterson's novel Snow Falling on Cedars (1994) and its 1999 film adaptation refer to the incarceration of the Imada family in Manzanar.
 Cynthia Kadohata's historical novel Weedflower (2006) is told from the perspective of the twelve-year-old Japanese-American protagonist, and received many awards and recognition.
 Florence Crannell Means' novel The Moved-Outers (1945) centers on a high school senior and her family's treatment during the incarceration of Japanese Americans. It was a Newbery Honor recipient in 1946.
 John Okada's novel No-No Boy (1956) features a protagonist from Seattle, who was incarcerated with his family and imprisoned for answering "no" to the last two questions on the loyalty questionnaire. It explores the postwar environment in the Pacific Northwest.
 Jeanne Wakatsuki Houston and James D. Houston’s book Farewell to Manzanar (1973) about Jeanne’s experiences in the Manzanar  War Relocation Center and her life after. It explores her experience as a child in the camp.
 Julie Otsuka's novel The Buddha in the Attic (2011), winner of the PEN/Faulkner Award for Fiction, tells the story of Japanese female immigrants in California, and ends on the story of the concentration camps and the reaction of neighbors left behind.
 Julie Otsuka's novel When the Emperor was Divine (2002) tells the story of an unnamed Japanese-American family incarcerated at the Topaz War Relocation Center in Utah. The novel is based on Otsuka's own family's experiences.
 Kermit Roosevelt III's historical novel Allegiance (2015) takes readers inside the US government and Supreme Court to examine the legal and moral debates and the little-known facts surrounding the detention of Japanese Americans. A Harper Lee Prize finalist, the novel is based on a true story.
 Vivienne Schiffer's novel Camp Nine (2013) is set in and near the Rohwer Japanese American concentration camp in Arkansas.
 Toyoko Yamasaki wrote about the conflicting allegiances of Japanese Americans during the war in Futatsu no Sokoku (1983). University of Hawai'i Press published an English language translation by V. Dixon Morris under the title Two Homelands in 2007. It was dramatized into a limited series of the same name by TV Tokyo in 2019.
 George Takei published a graphic novel titled They Called Us Enemy (2019) about his time in concentration camps, the plight of Japanese-Americans during the war, and the social & legal ramifications following the closure of the camps. It was co-written by Justin Eisinger and Steven Scott and illustrated by Harmony Becker. The book was awarded the Asian/Pacific American Librarians Association (APLA)-Literature, Eisner Award, and American Book Award in 2020.

Music
 Fort Minor's "Kenji" (2005) tells the story of Mike Shinoda's grandfather and his experience in the camps.
 Jake Shimabukuro's solo album Peace Love Ukulele (2011) includes the song "Go For Broke" inspired by the World War II all-Japanese American 442nd US Army unit.
 Kishi Bashi's 2019 album Omoiyari uses the incarceration program as its central theme.
 Mia Doi Todd's 2020 song Take What You Can Carry (Scientist Dub One) is about the camp's impact on her mother and grandmother. It was released on February 20, 2020 when California lawmakers passed a resolution to formally apologize to Japanese-Americans for the Legislature's role in their incarceration.

Spoken word
 George Carlin, during his monologues on individual rights and criticism towards the American government, spoke about the relocation of Japanese American citizens to the designated camps.

Television
 Hawaii Five-0 Episode 81, "Honor Thy Father" (December 2013), is dedicated to solving a cold case murder at the Honouliuli Internment Camp, some 70 years earlier.
 Much of The Terror: Infamy (2019) takes place at a fictional WRA camp in Oregon.
 Toyoko Yamasaki's Japanese language novel, Futatsu no Sokoku, addressesing the conflicting allegiances of Japanese Americans in the camps, was dramatized into a limited series of the same name by TV Tokyo in 2019.

Theater
 The musical Allegiance (2013), which premiered in San Diego, California, was inspired by the camp experiences of its star, George Takei.

Legal legacy

Several significant legal decisions arose out of Japanese-American incarceration, relating to the powers of the government to detain citizens in wartime. Among the cases which reached the US Supreme Court were Ozawa v. United States (1922), Yasui v. United States (1943), Hirabayashi v. United States (1943), ex parte Endo (1944), and Korematsu v. United States (1944). In Ozawa, the court established that peoples defined as 'white' were specifically of Caucasian descent; In Yasui and Hirabayashi, the court upheld the constitutionality of curfews based on Japanese ancestry; in Korematsu, the court upheld the constitutionality of the exclusion order. In Endo, the court accepted a petition for a writ of habeas corpus and ruled that the WRA had no authority to subject a loyal citizen to its procedures.

Korematsu's and Hirabayashi's convictions were vacated in a series of coram nobis cases in the early 1980s. In the coram nobis cases, federal district and appellate courts ruled that newly uncovered evidence revealed an unfairness which, had it been known at the time, would likely have changed the Supreme Court's decisions in the Yasui, Hirabayashi, and Korematsu cases.

These new court decisions rested on a series of documents recovered from the National Archives showing that the government had altered, suppressed, and withheld important and relevant information from the Supreme Court, including the Final Report by General DeWitt justifying the incarceration program. The Army had destroyed documents in an effort to hide alterations that had been made to the report to reduce their racist content. The coram nobis cases vacated the convictions of Korematsu and Hirabayashi (Yasui died before his case was heard, rendering it moot), and are regarded as part of the impetus to gain passage of the Civil Liberties Act of 1988.

The rulings of the US Supreme Court in the Korematsu and Hirabayashi cases were criticized in Dictum in the 2018 majority opinion of Trump v. Hawaii upholding a ban on immigration of nationals from several Muslim majority countries but not overruled as it fell outside the case-law applicable to the lawsuit. Regarding the Korematsu case, Chief Justice Roberts wrote: "The forcible relocation of U.S. citizens to concentration camps, solely and explicitly on the basis of race, is objectively unlawful and outside the scope of Presidential authority."

Former Supreme Court Justice Tom C. Clark, who represented the US Department of Justice in the "relocation", writes in the epilogue to the book Executive Order 9066: The Internment of 110,000 Japanese Americans (1992):

See also 
 Anti-Japanese sentiment in the United States
 Deportation of Koreans in the Soviet Union
 Internment of German Americans, in World War II
 Internment of Italian Americans, in World War II
 Internment of Japanese Canadians, in World War II
 Japanese Americans
 Nativism (politics) in the United States
 Stereotypes of East Asians in the United States
 Yellow Peril

References

Further reading

 Daniels, Roger. "The Decisions to Relocate the North American Japanese: Another Look," Pacific Historical Review (1982) 51#1 pp 71–77; states that the U.S. and Canada coordinated their policies
 Drinnon, Richard. Keeper of Concentration Camps: Dillon S. Meyer and American Racism. Berkeley: University of California Press, 1989.
 
 
 
 

 
 Leonard, Kevin Allen. "'Is That What We Fought for?' Japanese Americans and Racism in California, The Impact of World War II." Western Historical Quarterly 21.4 (1990): 463-482. online
 Lotchin, Roger W. Japanese American Relocation in World War II: A Reconsideration (Cambridge University Press, 2018)
 
 
 
  Ng, Wendy L. Japanese American Internment During World War II: A History and Reference Guide (Greenwood, 2002).
  Platts, Adam. American Internment: World War II Japanese American Internment Camps (Lulu, 2022).

External links
 Ireizō - website that contains the names of every single individual with Japanese ancestry who was incarcerated in an internment camp within the United States during WWII

 
Anti-Japanese sentiment in the United States
Japanese Americans
Japanese-American history
Presidency of Franklin D. Roosevelt
Human rights abuses in the United States
United States home front during World War II
Civil detention in the United States
World War II sites in the United States
Articles containing video clips
Persecution of Buddhists
Collective punishment
Political repression in the United States